Air Safaris was a British scheduled and charter airline from 1959 to 1962.

History 

Air Safaris Limited was formed on 26 November 1959 equipped with four-engined Handley Page Hermes and twin-engined Vickers Viking airliners to operate scheduled and charter flights based at London Gatwick Airport. Originally started as Meredith Air Transport in 1952 as a Dakota operator it changed name in November 1954 to African Air Safaris Limited and in 1956 bought a Handley Page Hermes from the British Overseas Airways Corporation. It acquired two Vikings in 1959 and with a move to Gatwick Airport became Air Safaris.

In 1960 the company acquired the transport division of Don Everall Aviation with its scheduled flights from Birmingham Airport and one Viking aircraft. The airline opened an operating and maintenance base at Hurn Airport in 1961. The company operated charters from most British airports but by 1961 had ceased operating.

When the company ceased operations on 2 November 1961 it had five Hermes and eight Vikings, the 200 staff were given formal notice that the company would close due to "money difficulties". An official from the company announced that they were trying to save the company but the following week a receiver was appointed.

At a meeting of creditors on 29 January 1962 the company had a total deficiency of £521,073, the failure of the company was attributed by the directors to insufficient capital and too rapid expansion, loss of income from aircraft under repair, high wage costs and large hire-purchase payments were also cited. As the company's assets would just about cover the debts the company was handed over to the official receiver to liquidate.

Fleet 

Douglas Dakota (Meredith Air Transport)
Handley Page Hermes
Vickers VC.1 Viking

See also
 List of defunct airlines of the United Kingdom

References 
Notes

Sources
 

Defunct airlines of the United Kingdom
Airlines established in 1959
Airlines disestablished in 1962